Delaneysville is a ghost town in Coshocton County, in the U.S. state of Ohio.

History
Delaneysville was laid out around 1840 by one Mr. Delaney, and named for him.

References

Geography of Coshocton County, Ohio